Waitemata or Waitematā may refer to:

 Waitematā Harbour, the primary harbour of Auckland, New Zealand
 Waitematā (local board area), a local government area in Auckland, New Zealand
 Waitematā Local Board, a local board of Auckland Council, formed in 2010
 Waitematā and Gulf Ward, a Ward of Auckland Council including the above local board
 Waitemata (ship), a Union Steam ship cargo boat used as a troop ship in World War One
 Waitemata City, a historical local government area, merged into Waitakere City in 1989
 Waitemata (New Zealand electorate), a historical electorate from 1871 to 1946, and from 1954 to 1978
 Waitemata AFC, a football club based in Waitemata City
 Waitemata Dolphins, a basketball team based in Auckland